The Roxas Vanguards are a professional basketball team based in Roxas, Zamboanga del Norte which plays in the Mindanao division of the Pilipinas VisMin Super Cup.

History
The Roxas Vanguards was formed by the municipal government of Roxas, Zamboanga del Norte under Mayor Jan Hendrik Vallecer upon the suggestion of Zamboanga del Norte governor Roberto Uy to send a team for the Pilipinas VisMin Super Cup. The Vanguards managed to reach the Mindanao leg best-of-three finals of the 1st Conference in mid-2021 where it lost to the Basilan Peace Riders. In the second conference in December 2021, the Vanguards finished as quarterfinalists with their stint ended by the Zamboanga Sibugay Warriors which had a twice-to-beat advantage.

References

2021 establishments in the Philippines
Pilipinas VisMin Super Cup teams